L. orientalis  may refer to:
 Lactuca orientalis, a plant species
 Lacuna orientalis, a sea snail species
 Lasionycta orientalis, a moth species found in Tajikistan and Kyrgyzstan
 Laxmannia orientalis, a tufted perennial herb species in the genus Laxmannia endemic to Australia
 Leptorhynchos orientalis, an annual or perennial herb species in the genus Leptorhynchos endemic to Australia
 Limaria orientalis, the file shell, a bivalve mollusc species
 Liquidambar orientalis, the Oriental sweetgum or Turkish sweetgum, a deciduous tree species native to the eastern Mediterranean region
 Lonchoptera orientalis, a spear-winged fly species in the genus Lonchoptera

See also
 Orientalis (disambiguation)